openPipeline is an open-source plug-in for Autodesk Maya that is designed to assist in a Production Pipeline structure and Computer animation.

Development
Created in Maya Embedded Language, openPipeline was initiated at Eyebeam Atelier and further developed at Pratt Institute in the Digital Arts Lab. The initial release date was December 28, 2006.

Contributors
 Rob O'Neill (Creator)
 Paris Mavroidis
 Meng-Han Ho

References
 Computer Graphics World (2009)  "Building the Perfect Production Pipeline"
 ACM Siggraph Educator's Program (2007) "openPipeline: teaching and implementing animation production pipelines in an academic setting"

External links
 openPipeline page at CreativeCrash.com
 openPipeline project page on SourceForge.Net
 openPipeline at KickstandLabs.com

Graphics software